The provincial military commander was a high military official in the Chinese provinces of the Qing dynasty (1644–1911). There was one in each province, ranked 1b. Under the jurisdiction of the provincial governor (巡撫 xúnfǔ) and sometimes a governor-general, he was in charge of the Chinese military forces known as the Green Standards (綠營 lǜyíng), but had no control over the Eight Banners. The provincial military commander is also known as provincial commander-in-chief and general-in-chief.

References

Government of the Qing dynasty
Qing dynasty tidus